"Slumber Party" is a song recorded by American singer Britney Spears for her ninth studio album, Glory (2016). It was written by Mattias Larsson, Robin Fredriksson, Julia Michaels and Justin Tranter, and produced by Mattman & Robin. The duo was also responsible for vocal production along with Mischke. The song was released as the second single from the album on November 16, 2016, featuring vocals from American singer Tinashe in a remix version. It was sent to US contemporary hit radio on November 22, 2016. A reggae-pop and R&B track, "Slumber Party" features brass, marimba, "syncopated synths", percussion and a horn section in its instrumentation. Lyrically, the song is defined as an ode to fornication and making sex tapes, where Spears uses double entendre, while evoking one-night stands, the ritual of sleepovers with friends and the teenage game of seven minutes in heaven.

A music video directed by Colin Tilley was shot on October 25, 2016, and according to Spears, has an Eyes Wide Shut theme. The video was released on November 18, 2016. It features Spears and Tinashe during a sleepover-themed masquerade party in a mansion, where they are seen in rooms filled with bubbles, smoke and flashing lights. The video also features Spears husband Sam Asghari. Commercially, the song appeared on the national charts in countries including Canada, Spain, Scotland and the United States, where it debuted and peaked at 86 on the Billboard Hot 100, and topped the Dance Club Songs chart after several weeks. It is the second single from Glory to top that chart following "Make Me...". Spears added "Slumber Party" to the set list of her residency show, Britney: Piece of Me. The song appeared in Just Dance 2018.

Background and release

In September 2014, Spears posted a picture of herself in the studio, hinting that she was recording new music. A month later, during an interview, she revealed that she was working "very slowly, but progressively" on the album. In 2015, she continued to work on the album, and in November 2015, Spears teased on her Instagram account that she was working with songwriters Justin Tranter and Julia Michaels, by posting a picture of them looking "bemused" with the caption: "Working hard and hardly working...new album...wheeeee!." A month later, Tranter gave an interview for website NewNowNext about his work with Spears, saying: "Working with Britney is a fucking dream. She is so sweet, so inspiring and a master on the mic. Me and Julia had to leave the studio one day because our screams of excitement after every take she did were distracting the producers." In May 2016, in an interview for website Breathe Heavy, he revealed: "Nobody ever talks about Britney as a writer and she's f**king great, like insane. Her concepts were bold and smart and very left of centre, in a good way. Melodically, she has melodies for days. How come no one mentions that this girl can write the f**k out of a song?. [...] "We got to work with her a bunch of times. A couple [of songs] we wrote on our own and then she wanted to write with us. She's an amazing writer."

After releasing "Make Me..." as the first single from the album, Spears' team commissioned several polls for different magazines to ask which song from Glory should be the album's second single. On October 14, 2016, American singer Tinashe hinted on her Instagram account that she was recording vocals on a "legendary" collaboration with the caption: "Dreams are real." Later, on October 25, 2016, Spears posted a picture of herself with Tinashe on the set of the song's music video, with the caption: "Neighbors say we're causing a commotion...", a line from "Slumber Party". Billboard also confirmed the news with Spears' rep. Lewis Corner of Digital Spy also announced that the collaboration was going to be released "within a matter of weeks." Spears later commented about Tinashe, stating: "Tinashe is so sweet. I always see my fans talking about her online, and it just made so much sense to collaborate on this song. She was amazing, and would love to find another way to work together in the future!." The remix version was released on November 16, 2016, to digital download. It was sent to US contemporary hit radio on November 22, 2016.

During a 2022 interview on Watch What Happens Live with Andy Cohen, English singer Charli XCX revealed that she was asked to be featured on the remix of "Slumber Party", but she had to turn it down due to the scheduling conflicts.

Composition

"Slumber Party" was written by Mattias Larsson, Robin Fredriksson, Julia Michaels and Justin Tranter, with production being done by Mattman & Robin. Spears' vocals spans from the low note D3 to the high note E5.  Mattman & Robin were also responsible for vocal production, along with Mischke, as well as programming, drums, percussion, snaps, handclaps, synths, guitars, bass, marimba and brass. Michaels, on the other hand, provided background vocals. The song was recorded at 158 Studios, Westlake Village, California, Wolf Cousins Studios, Stockholm, Sweden, and at Conway Recording Studios, Los Angeles, California. "Slumber Party" is a reggae-pop and R&B track, that lasts for three minutes and thirty-four seconds (3:34). It has "a sinuous groove accented by brass and marimba", "syncopated synths", "cooing backing vocals" and percussion. Its final chorus features "a bombastic horn section." For Alex Macpherson of The Guardian, the song "is reminiscent of Spears' 2003 album, In the Zone." Lewis Corner of Digital Spy noted that the song has a 'Hotline Bling'-style, a statement that Gay Times Daniel Megarry and No Ripcord's Luiza Lodder agreed.

Lyrically, "Slumber Party" talks about sex and was considered an "ode to fornication" and making sex tapes, where Spears uses an "euphemism for one-night stands", while invoking the "ritual of sleepovers with friends" and "the teenage game of seven minutes in heaven." In the pre-chorus, she promises, "We ain't gonna sleep tonight", while during the chorus, she sings, "We use our bodies to make our own videos/ Put on our music that makes us go fucking crazy, oh."

Critical reception
Alex Macpherson of The Guardian noted that "Slumber Party's high-school metaphor would probably seem odder coming from a singer of that age; Spears sings it with self-awareness and a thorough commitment to the role-play scenario." Alim Kheraj of Digital Spy called it "dreamy and genuinely sexy, something that Britney hasn't truly been since Blackout. Kheraj also praised the "delightful" syncopated synths in the chorus" and "the surprising addition of a bombastic horn section in the final chorus", while remarking: "Similarly, the final chorus contains the best Britney ad-libs this side of 2003. Now, all they need to do is get Drake on a remix on this and we've got a smash on our hands." Joe Pasmore of Attitude picked it as a highlight, declaring that "while sharing Britney's nostalgic flare, [it] boast[s] modern production which brings the track firmly into 2016." Josh Duboff of Vanity Fair named it "a slinky, catchy jam", Jonathan Riggs of Idolator labeled it "reggae-licious", while Neil McCormick of The Daily Telegraph called it "effervescently catchy" and "a gem of slinky TLC."

Stephen Thomas Erlewine of AllMusic cited "Slumber Party" as a "heavy-breathing come-on that never manage[s] to seem sexy despite the flood of innuendo." Writing for Drowned in Sound, Russell Warfield opined that the song "has a shot of being Britney's first bona fide hit since 'Womanizer' (2008)." Michael Arceneaux of Complex simply said that the song "serves its purpose quite well", calling it "another danceable song." Describing it as a sultry "pop take on Drake's smash hit Hotline Bling", Daniel Megarry of Gay Times remarked: "if this doesn't make your libido increase, nothing will." John Murphy of musicOMH commented about its sexual lyrics, declaring that the song "still manages to possess a slightly illicit thrill." Michael Smith of Renowned for Sound noted that the song "starts like Britney's sexier R&B songs, like 'Blur', but spins reggae into its chorus in a way that feels much on trend after Gwen Stefani's 'This Is What the Truth Feels Like'."

Chart performance 
"Slumber Party" debuted in France, in its original version, on the Syndicat National de l'Édition Phonographique chart at number 157. A week later, it climbed to number 121. In Spain, the song debuted at number 39, becoming Spears' sixth consecutive top-forty entry and Tinashe's first entry. In Hungary, the song managed to debut inside the top-twenty, charting at number 13, becoming Glory second top-twenty single. In the United States, "Slumber Party" debuted and peaked at number 86 on the Billboard Hot 100, with its music video generating "considerable weekly streaming activity", most precisely 3.8 million, as well as receiving "chart points from sales and radio airplay". It also became Spears' 36th Hot 100 entry and Tinashe's fourth. On the Pop Songs chart, the song debuted at number 39; Spears' 34th entry on the chart and Tinashe's third. It later peaked at 27. It topped the Dance Club Songs chart, becoming the second single from Glory to do so, and Spears' overall 11th number one dance song on that chart. The single also entered at number 73 on the UK Singles Sales chart.

Music video

Background and development
The music video for the song was directed by Colin Tilley and was shot on October 25, 2016, as Spears posted on her Instagram a photo of herself with Tinashe on the music video's set. Tinashe later shared the same photo, with the caption: "The face you make when the rumors are true and you collabed with your idol & basically your whole life is a dream so you keep it cute for Brit but inside you are wigless and dead." Spears also posted a photo with her backup dancers and other with Tilley in the "purpley-blue room". Lewis Corner of Digital Spy noted that "the visual looks set to be very seductive, with dimmed blue lights and provocative outfits." During an interview for Extras Mario Lopez, Spears commented that the music video will be a younger version of Stanley Kubrick's film Eyes Wide Shut (1999), adding: "It's a little risky. It's very sexy. It's very moody. It's fun!." During an interview with MTV for Snapchat, Spears added: "The vibe was what you see in the video. Amazing costumes, energy, dancing, and people. We were filming a music video that portrays an incredible party, and that's what it felt like on set." The music video was released on November 18, 2016, and premiered on MTV's Snapchat Discover page shortly before being posted on Spears' official Vevo and YouTube pages.

Synopsis 

The video starts with Spears "roll[ing] up to a giant mansion wearing a tiny red dress. Upon entering, she's greeted by flame throwers and a slew of people ready to get their freak on", as stated by a writer from Fox News. Later, she is "spotted by the master of the house, a guy with what appears to be a David Bowie-esque lightning bolt on his face", as noted by the Billboard staff. They continued: "Tinashe appears midway through the story dressed for the slumber party, and the pair get cuddly on a couch in negligee before instigating a sexy dance sequence." They also "navigate rooms overflowing with bubbles, smoke and flashing lights." During the video, Spears "changes into a series of sexy ensembles -- some black lingerie, and others puffy blue princess skirts", as well as crawls across the table and "licks up spilled milk."

Reception 
Cole Delbyk, writing for The Huffington Post, wrote that the video "saved 2016" and compared Spears' head-twirling and body-rolling to her 2001 "I'm a Slave 4 U" video. Billboard Staff called the video "pure indulgence", while Megan French of Us Weekly named it "too hot to handle." Emilee Lindner of Fuse was extremely positive, writing: "It's hot. It's heavy. It's a Britney Spears video. It even has her recreating her 'Toxic' moves as she crawls toward the camera on a table." Lewis Corner of Digital Spy considered it "easily one of the hottest of her career so far", adding that "the pair look absolutely flawless in the seductive visual." For Zac Johnson of E! News, "Not since 'Boys' has Britney made walking through party look like art", and also praised the chemistry between Spears and Tinashe, as well as the scene where Spears is "crawling across the table and licking up spilled milk." Rolling Stone review highlighted that "director Colin Tilley peppers in salacious moments in the video wherever possible."

Cady Lang of Time wrote that the "unabashedly 'pop' feel of the video brings to mind the Brit that we all knew and loved back during her heyday — that is to say that there's no shortage of body glitter, choreographed group dance routines, candy colored ensembles, and toned abs during this grown-up 'Slumber Party'." Alexa Camp of Slant Magazine noted that the scene where Spears crawls on a dining room and licks spilled milk reminded her of a scene from Madonna's 1989 video for 'Express Yourself.'" Camp also stated that "the video employs sexuality—and homosexuality—purely for the benefit of the male gaze." While naming it "a fun, outrageous, and expensive-looking clip", Anna Gaca of Spin opined that the video is "miles better than the forced, brand-filled video for 'Make Me,' and the addition of Tinashe's vocals is enough to make you wonder why they ever released the song without her."

Live performances
Spears performed "Slumber Party" for the first time on her residency show, Britney: Piece of Me, on November 16, 2016. On December 2, 2016, Spears and Tinashe performed the song for the first time at the KIIS-FM Jingle Ball. A day later, they reprised the performance at 99.7's Triple Ho Show. "Slumber Party" was also performed on the 2017 Britney: Live in Concert Asian tour, as well as on the Piece of Me Tour in 2018, which covered North America and Europe.

Track listing
 Remix EP
 "Slumber Party" featuring Tinashe (Bad Royale Remix) – 3:12
 "Slumber Party" featuring Tinashe (Marc Stout & Scott Svejda Remix) – 3:52
 "Slumber Party" featuring Tinashe (Bimbo Jones Remix) – 3:54
 "Slumber Party" featuring Tinashe (Danny Dove Remix) – 3:40
 "Slumber Party" featuring Tinashe (Misha K Remix) – 3:35

Credits and personnel
Credits adapted from the liner notes of Glory.

Recording
Vocals recorded at 158 Studios, Westlake Village, California; Conway Recording Studios, Los Angeles, California; and at Wolf Cousins Studios, Stockholm, Sweden
Mixed at MixStar Studios, Virginia Beach, Virginia

Personnel

Britney Spears – lead vocals
Tinashe – guest vocals on remix
Mattman & Robin – songwriter, producer, vocal production, vocal recording, programming, drums, percussion, snaps, handclaps, synths, guitars, bass, marimba, brass
Julia Michaels – songwriter, additional background vocals
Justin Tranter – songwriter
Mischke – vocal production
Benjamin Rice – vocal recording
Erik Beltz – recording assistant
John Cranfield – engineer
Serban Ghenea – mixing
John Hanes – mixing engineer

Charts

Weekly charts

Monthly charts

Year-end charts

Release history

References

2016 singles
2016 songs
American reggae songs
Britney Spears songs
Music videos directed by Colin Tilley
Reggae fusion songs
Song recordings produced by Mattman & Robin
Songs written by Julia Michaels
Songs written by Justin Tranter
Songs written by Mattias Larsson
Songs written by Robin Fredriksson
Songs about parties
Tinashe songs
Female vocal duets